Dhuvaran Thermal Power Station is a decommissioned oil and gas power plant located at Khambhat in Anand district, Gujarat. The power plant was under ownership of state owned Gujarat State Electricity Corporation Limited. This was the first power plant of Gujarat Electricity Board, the parent company of Gujarat State Electricity Corporation Limited.

Capacity
The power plant stands decommissioned since December 2010.

References 

Oil-fired power stations in Gujarat
Anand district
Energy infrastructure completed in 1965
1965 establishments in Gujarat
20th-century architecture in India